is a Japanese voice actress, choreographer, dancer and singer from Hyōgo Prefecture. She appeared on Kōhaku Uta Gassen as background dancer behind Ami Suzuki in 1999 and 2000. She used the name  and others in her previous roles. She is also credited as FES from the band  in the Science Adventure visual novel series, which is a stage name of her character Ayase Kishimoto from Chaos;Head.

Filmography

Anime 
 Happiness! (2006), Haruhi Kamisaka
 Otome wa Boku ni Koishiteru (2006), Hisako Kajiura
 Super Robot Wars Original Generation: Divine Wars (2006), Leona Garstein
 Prism Ark (2007), Priecia
 Chaos;Head (2008), Ayase Kishimoto
 H2O: Footprints in the Sand (2008), Hamaji Yakumo
 Nyan Koi! (2009), Kumaneko
 Super Robot Wars Original Generation: The Inspector (2010), Leona Garstein
 Koi to Senkyo to Chocolate (2012), Mieru Ariake
 Seikoku no Dragonar (2014),  Navi

Original video animation 
 Papillon Rose (2003), Sister Pchela
 Touhou Project Side Story: Hoshi no Kioku (2007), Kaguya Houraisan
 Harukoi Otome (2008), Umi Hayasaka
 Yotsunoha (2008), Nono Nekomiya
 Mayo elle Otokonoko (2010), Umezaemon Matsukaze

Web Anime 
 Saishū Shiken Kujira (2007), Niina Mikage

Console games 
 St. Luminous Mission High School (2000), Yuka Tajima
 Super Robot Wars Alpha (2000), Leona Garstein
 Nukumori no Naka de: in the warmth (2001) Rina Shinbashi
 Super Robot Wars Alpha for Dreamcast (2001), Leona Garstein
 Chocolate♪Kiss (2002), Natsuki Tachibana
 Jockey's Road (2002), Hikaru Kamiya
 Konohana 2: Todokanai Requiem (2002), Mayumi Shiina, Yuko Oomi and Masami Kitayama
 Konohana 3: Itsuwari no Kage no Mukō ni (2003), Mayumi Shiina, Yuko Oomi, Masami Kitayama
 Fu-un Shinsengumi (2004), Ikumatsu
 Tokyo Majin Gakuen Gehouchou Keppuuroku (2004), Fureiya
 Fu-un Bakumatsu-den (2005), Ikumatsu
 Konohana 4: Yami o Harau Inori (2006), Mayumi Shiina, Yuko Oomi
 Kūron Yōma Gakuenki re:charge (2006), Itsuha Hibiki, Mayuko
 Mutsuboshi☆Kirari: Hoshifuru Miyako (2006), Hokuto, Araki Miyako
 Happiness! De:Luxe (2007), Haruhi Kamisaka
 Nitro Royale (2007), Natsumi Aihara
 Ojousama Kumikyoku -SweetConcert- (2007), Nanase Iwamoto
 Saishū Shiken Kujira Alive (2007), Niina Mikage
 Super Robot Wars OG: Original Generations (2007), Leona Garstein
 Super Robot Wars OG Gaiden (2007), Leona Garstein
 H2O + (2008), Hamaji Yakumo
 Kanokon Esuii (2008), Shirane Kamura
 Prism Ark -Awake- (2008), Priecia
 The Amazon Road (2008), Johnny
 Yotsunoha: A Journey of Sincerity (2008), Nono Nekomiya
 Yggdra Union (2008), Kylier, Monica
 Chaos;Head Noah (2009), Ayase Kishimoto
 Pia Carrot e Yokoso!! G.P.: Gakuen Princess (2009), Hina Satō
 Pia Carrot e Yokoso!! G.P.: Gakuen Princess Portable (2009), Hina Satō
 Solfège: Sweet harmony (2009), Kagura Fujimiya
 Time Leap (2009), Ayumu
 77: beyond the Milky Way (2010), Kuu
 Chaos;Head Love Chu Chu! (2010), Ayase Kishimoto
 Game Book DS: Aquarian Age Perpetual Period (2010), Ai Amane
 Record of Agarest War 2 (2010), Figline
 Sakura Sakura: Haru Urara (2010), Kurumi Tachibana
 Tenshinranman Happy Go Lucky!! (2010), Kotaro Asagi
 Otome wa Boku ni Koishiteru: Futari no Elder Portable (2011), Utano Sasou
 Stella Glow (2015), Sakuya

PC game 
 Album no Naka no Hohoemi (1999), Yuzuko Sugadaira
 Heart de Network (2000), Mari Tsudanuma, Mūchan, Marine
 Sukidayo! (2000), Rina Shimbashi
 Memories Zero: Aoi Hikari no Yakusoku (2001), Yuumi Futaba
 Gakuen Counsellor (2002), Akiko Oodate
 "Hello, world." (2002), Natsumi Aibara
 Mayonaka wa Ware no Mono (2002), May
 Motto Muriyari! (2002), Moemi Asagi
 Sī Sī Syndrome (2002), Badrinath Silva
 Ane mo ne (2003), Futaba Shingūji
 Blaze of Destiny (2003), Lena Raputohōn
 Kakoi: Zetsubō no Shojo Kangokutō (2003), Kaede Kurata, Reika
 Oshikake Harem (2003), Excel Bouquet
 Sefure☆Syndrome (2003), Badrinard Silva
 to... (2003), Miho Ogasawara
 Chijoku Hitozuma Jogakuin (2004), Kaoru Mitone
 Kao no nai Tsuki: Suzuna Nikki (limited edition for fan club) (2004), Suzuna Kuraki
 Mutsuboshi Kirari (2004), Hokuto, Araki Miyako
 Oshikake Harem Hard Party (2004), Excel Bouquet
 Puni Puni Handmade (2004), Pochiko, Bochiko
 Saishū Shiken Kujira ~Departures~ (2004), Niina Mikage
 Akanaeru Sekai no Owari ni (2005), Chifuyu Oumi
 Gift (2005), Kirino Konosaka
 Gunjō no Sora o koete: Glas Auszeichnung (2005), Wakana Mizuki
 Hajimete no Otetsudai (2005), Yuuki Momono
 Happiness! (2005), Haruhi Kamisaka
 Bra-ban! -The bonds of melody- (2006), Tae Nakanoshima
 Gift: Nijiiro Stories (2006), Kirino Konosaka
 H2O: Footprints in the Sand (2006), Hamaji Yakumo
 Happiness! Re:Lucks (2006), Haruhi Kamisaka
 Harukoi Otome: Otome no Sono de Gokigen'yō (2006), Umi Hayasaka
 Himesama Ririshiku! (2006), Atirene
 Koiotome (2006), Misora Yamato
 Osananajimi tono Kurashikata (2006), Nono Nekomiya
 Otaku☆Masshigura (2006), Yoshitsuki Fukushima
 Potto -Rondo for Dears- (2006), Kimika Ogata
 Prism Ark (2006), Priecia
 Spitan: Spirits Expedition -in the Phantasmagoria- (2006), Zena Clousy
 Yotsunoha (2006), Nono Nekomiya
 Ah! Ojousama (2007), Kaori Shihou
 Alpeggio: Kimiiro no Melody (2007), Chisato Kitami
 Chu×Chu Idol -The idol is a Vampire?- (2007), Chuchu Astram, Chiyu Nakauchi, Chua Churam
 Chu×Chu Paradise (2007), Chuchu Astram, Chiyu Nakauchi, Chua Churam
 Dies irae -Also sprach Zarathustra- (2007), Marie
 eXceed3rd-Jade Penetrate- (2007), Sariabell Orphannights
 E×E (2007), Madoka Kamigoryou
 FairChild (2007), Kotori Hazumi
 Figurehead (2007), Eolie
 Happy☆Marguerite! (2007), Karin Hortensia Minahase
 Kannabi (2007), May
 Maid to Majutsushi (2007), Hondou Crimean Ōki
 Nagagutsu o Haita Deko (2007), Kasane Aifuri
 Nono to Kuraso! (2007), Nono Nekomiya
 Pastel (2007), Mio Momose
 Pia-jong (2007), Reona Kinoshita
 Piano no Mori no Mankai no Shita (2007), Kamimori Sakurano, Konohana
 Root after and another (2007), Hamaji Yakumo
 Sweet! (2007), Haori Midou
 Time Leap (2007), Ayumu
 Akatsuki no Goei (2008), Aya Nikaido
 Akatsuki no Goei: Principal tachi no Kyujitsu (2008), Aya Nikaidou
 Asanagi no Aquanauts (2008), Mio Asanagi
 Chaos;Head (2008), Ayase Kishimoto
 Chest Chase (2008), Nishiki Kiri
 Concerto Note (2008), Seika Nanagi
 D.C.P.K.: Da Capoker (2008), Siiren
 Furufuru Full Moon (2008), Noa Ninamori
 Konboku Mahjong: Konna Mahjong ga Attara Boku wa Ron! (2008), Ayumu (Ericia Quintaine de Yggdrasil)
 Pia Carrot e Yokoso!! G.P. (2008), Hina Satō
 Prism Ark Love Love Maxim! (2008), Priecia
 Sumaga (2008), Amaho Kusakabe
 77: And, two stars meet again (2009), Kuu
 Koko yori, Haruka -Surrounded sea in the world- (2009), Anna Hoshino
 Memoria (2009), Yuuki Hanks
 Midarete Majiwaru Ore to Hime: Hime to Shitsuji Utahime to Sonota Oozei to (2009), Hondou Crimean Ōki
 Reincarnation☆Shinsengumi (2009), Yue Kondo
 Sakura Sakura (2009), Kurumi Tachibana
 Signal Heart (2009), Kokone Amami
 Signal Heart Plus (2009), Kokone Amami
 Skyprythem (2009), Nanami Suzushiro
 Sumaga Special (2009), Amaho Kusakabe
 Tenshinranman -Lucky or Unlucky!?- (2009), Kotaro Asagi
 Tiara (2009), Claire Dorner
 Time Leap Paradise (2009), Ayumu
 Zettai Karen! Ojōsama (2009), Nanase Kinosaki
 Akatsuki no Goei: Tsumibukaki Shūmatsuron (2010), Aya Nikaidou
 Azanaeru (2010), Ena Fujimi
 Melclear: Mizu no Miyako ni Koi no Hanataba o (2010), Himiko Takamori
 Orange Memories (2010), Kokoro Akashi
 Otome wa Boku ni Koishiteru: Futari no Elder (2010), Utano Sasou
 Sora o Aogite Kumo Takaku (2010), Mint
 Koi to Senkyo to Chocolate (2010), Mieru Ariake
 Kimi to Boku to Eden no Ringo (2011), Karen Asakura
 Sakura Sakura Festival! (2011), Kurumi Tachibana
 Hatsukoi Time Capsule (2011), Mio Kiwada

Mobile games 

 Azur Lane (2017), HMS Aurora (12)

Drama CDs 

 Akanaeru Sekai no Owari ni (yyyy), Chifuyu Oumi
 Asanagi no Aquanauts (yyyy), Mio Asanagi
 Chaos;Head Drama CD:The parallel bootleg (yyyy), Ayase Kishimoto
 Dies irae Drama CD Wehrwolf (yyyy), Marie
 Gift Drama CD (series) (yyyy), Kirino Konosaka
 Happiness! Yuki no Valentine's Day (yyyy), Haruhi Kamisaka
 "Hello, world.": Butchake Hello, world. (yyyy), Hatsumi Aihara
 Himesama Ririshiku! (yyyy), Atirene
 Hoshi no Kioku (yyyy), Kaguya Houraisan
 Koi no Hibiscus (yyyy), Nono Nekomiya, Takada-san
 Magical☆Drama CD: Bust to Bust to Prelude (yyyy), Ibuki
 Otome wa Boku ni Koishiteru: Natsu no Cosmos, Aki no Matsurika (yyyy), Nao Sakurai
 Otome wa Boku ni Koishiteru (yyyy), Hirako Kajiura
 Play☆Stationery (yyyy), Harumi
 Prism Ark (series) (yyyy), Priecia
 Solfège (series) (yyyy), Kagura Fujimiya
 Sukidayo! (yyyy), Rina Shimbashi
 Sakura Sakura: Sōshisōai (yyyy), Kurumi Tachibana
 Bi -vi-: #1 Ten to Chi to (yyyy), Sanada Yukimura
 Yggdra Unison: Seiken Buyūden (yyyy), Kylier
 Yotsunoha (series) (yyyy), Nono Nekomiya

Dubbing
Over the Hedge (2006), Stella

Other
 Voiceroid+ Kotonoha Akane & Aoi (April 2014)
 Voiceroid2 Kotonoha Akane & Aoi (June 2017)
 Synthesizer V Kotonoha Akane & Aoi (July 2020)

Discography

Albums 
 yuithm
Released by LOVE×TRAX on January 27, 2006
 Realythm
 jewelry days - August Fan Box main theme
  - Konneko opening theme
  - Mozu no Nie... ~Hayanie no Sho~ opening theme
  - Ane mo ne opening theme
  - to... opening theme
 It's just love - Sukidayo! ending theme
  - UNDER GROUND endingtheme
  - Papillon Rose G opening theme
  - Nukumori no naka de opening theme
  - Motto! Ojamajo Doremi ending theme
 school meet you - Sukumizu Police opening theme
  - Ane mo ne ending theme
 Traveling - Blaze of Destiny ending theme
 melody
  (secret track)
 HONEY
Released by LOVE×TRAX on September 22, 2006
 HONEY
 refrain - Blaze of Destiny opening theme
 Favorite Love - Otaku☆Masshigura opening theme
  - Mirorama opening theme
  - Mirorama ending theme
 You make me! - Yu Me Ku Me! ~Wakeari Bukken, Yōsei Tsuki~ opening theme
 Wake me up! - Koiotome opening theme
  - Papillon Rose G ending theme
 Beautiful Harmony - Bra-ban! -The bonds of melody- opening theme
  - Konneko ending theme
 Shining Orange - Yotsunoha ending theme
 Happy Birthday
 ONE DAY - Akanaeru Sekai no Owari ni insert song
  - Piano no Mori no Mankai no Shita opening theme
 Love×2♪song -English Version-
 princess
Released by LOVE×TRAX on September 21, 2007
 princess
 Chu×Chu!! - Chu×Chu Idol -The idol is a Vampire? opening theme
 I Will...! -  Utsurigi Nanakoi Tenkiame opening theme
 Just I wish -  Utsurigi Nanakoi Tenkiame insert song
  - Osananajimi tono Kurashikata opening theme
 VOYAGEURS - NEO STEAM image song
  - Happiness! Re:Lucks opening theme
 SINCLAIR - Shūmatsu Shōjo Gensō Alicematic opening theme
 core - Shūmatsu Shōjo Gensō Alicematic insert theme
 SHOOTING STAR - Itsuka, Todoku, Anosorani. opening theme
 Trust in me - EXE opening theme
 Eternal Destiny - Yoake Mae yori Ruri Iro na opening theme
 LOVEclick☆ - LOVE×Radio theme song
 dreaming - Hobi Radi theme song
 Joker
Released by LOVE×TRAX☆Records on September 10, 2008
 Love Game (JOKER prelude)
 JOKER - G-Taste OVA theme song
 Einsatz - Dies irae opening theme
 Believe
 Happy Leap - Time Leap opening theme
 Over the Light - Nanairo Kanata insert song
 Together - Akatsuki no Goei opening theme
  - Furufuru☆Fullmoon opening theme
 Till I can see you again - Chu x Chu Paradise ending theme
 Get Love Power - Konboku Mahjong: Konna Mahjong ga Attara Boku wa Ron! opening theme
 Aqua Voice - Asanagi no Aquanauts opening theme
 Ready Go!! - Fate/Tiger Colosseum opening theme
 Imitation - Imitation Lover opening theme
 Girl meets Boy - Tokimeki Fantasy Latale image song
 message!
 ~PHANTASM~ End Prophecy as FES (PHANTASM 1st album)
Compilation album of songs from Chaos;Head; Released by Media Factory on May 6, 2009 
  （Black Mass Ver.）
 
 
 
  (To the distance Ver.)
  (Heavy Generation Ver.)
  (Extra Solo Ver.)
 
 
 Dream Party Memorial Album
Released by DreamParty Secretariat on June 30, 2009
 Brightness
 Dream a go!go!（ArrangementVersion）
  (CoverVersion)
 Premonition Dream（ArrangementVersion）
 Shiny Road
 Rose quartz（ArrangementVersion）
 Summer Angel☆
 To be continued...
 Happy Day☆（ArrangementVersion）
 The desert of time
 Thank you for us（ArrangementVersion）
 Sign
 LOVE×singles
Released by LOVE×TRAX on July 3, 2009
 Jewelry days - August Fan Box theme song
 Love×2♪song - LOVE×Radio theme song
  - Piano no Mori no Mankai no Shita opening theme
  - Piano no Mori no Mankai no Shita ending theme
 Eternal Destiny - Yoake Mae yori Ruri Iro na opening theme
 Love☆Emergency - LOVE×Radio theme song
 Imitation - Imitation Lover opening theme
 feel - Imitation Lover ending theme
 Jewelry days（Instrumental）
 Love×2♪song（Instrumental）
 （Instrumental）
 （Instrumental）
 Eternal Destiny（Instrumental）
 Love☆Emergency（Instrumental）
 Imitation（Instrumental）
 feel（Instrumental）
 Yeeeeell!
Released by LOVE×TRAX on August 26, 2009
 Yeeeeell!
 It's show time - Time Leap Paradise opening theme
  - Tenshinranman -LUCKY or UNLUCKY!?- opening theme
  - ''Alpeggio: Kimiiro no Melody opening theme
 ACTION!
 warmth
 Eternal Ring - Unity Marriage: Futari no Hanayome opening theme
  - Himawari no Chapel de Kimi to opening theme
 Festivity - Chu×Chu Paradise theme song
 Blue eyes - Asanagi no Aquanauts enging theme
 Try Real! - Fate/tiger Colosseum UPPER theme song
 selfish
  - Potto -Rondo for Dears- opening theme
  - "Hello, world." ending theme
  - Meguri, Hitohira opening theme
 EVERGREEN
Released by b-fairy records on November 26, 2009
 
  - Galaxy Angel II Eigō Kaiki no Toki opening theme
 Aqua Voice - Asanagi no Aquanauts opening theme
  - Sakura Tail opening theme
 Ping×Otome=Koi - Ane imo 2: Imoimo Fan Disc opening theme
  - Happiness! opening theme
  - H2O: Footprints in the Sand insert song
  - Musō Tōrō theme song
  - Galaxy Angel II Eigō Kaiki no Toki ending theme of chapter 8 and 10
  - Monster Collection TCG theme song
  - Time Leap Paradise ending theme
  - Harumoi opening theme
  - H2O: Footprints in the Sand opening song
 You♡I
Released by 5pb. on February 3, 2010
 LOOP
  - 12RIVEN opening theme
  - Happiness! De:Luxe opening theme
  - Prism Ark opening theme
 Silky Rain - Anison Plus opening theme in June 2009
 
  - Happiness! ending theme
 Distance - 12RIVEN ending theme
 RISE -Prism Ark AWAKE ending theme
 Déjà vu - Hapitora -Happy Transportation- opening theme
  - Kanokon ending theme
  - Kanokon Esuii insert song
  - Kanokon Esuii ending song
 Eternal Snow - Anison Plus opening theme in February 2009
 You I - we will be together
 BLOODY TUNE
Released by LOVE×TRAX on August 25, 2010
 BLOODY TUNE
 Gregorio (L×T mix) Dies irae -Also sprach Zarathustra- opening theme
  - Akatsuki no Goei: Tsumibukaki Shūmatsuron opening theme
  - Natsuzora Kanata ending theme
 Miss．Brand-new day - Zettai☆Maō opening theme
 FairChild - FairChild opening theme
  - Airebo -IDOL☆REVOLUTION- opening theme
 My Dear HERO - RGH: Koi to Hero to Gakuen to ending theme
 =Suki - Sweet! opening theme
 Love☆Jet! - LOVE×Radio theme song
 summer day
 STAR LEGEND - 77: And, two stars meet again opening theme
  - Touhou Project Side Story: Hoshi no Kioku ending theme
 ONENESS!
 HONEY -dance remix- (HAPPY☆LOVE×Live 2009 original remix)

 ~PHANTASM~ Revival Prophecy as FES (PHANTASM 2nd album)
Released by Media Factory on December 21, 2011 
  - Steins;Gate -Anime ED-
  
  - Steins;Gate -PSP ED-
  - Steins;Gate -main theme from Rai-Net anime-
  - Chaos;Head Noah -PSP ED-
  - Chaos;Head Love Chu☆Chu -Xbox 360 ED-
  - Steins;Gate: Hiyoku Renri no Darling -ED-
  
  
  - Chaos;Head Love Chu☆Chu -PSP ED-
  - Chaos;Head -insert song-
  Prophecy ～Gate of Steiner～
  - Steins;Gate -Xbox 360 ED-

Maxi singles 
 jewelry days
Released by LOVE×TRAX☆Records on August 27, 2004
 jewelry days - August Fan Box main theme
 Love×2♪song - LOVE×Radio main theme
 Jewelry days (instrumental)
 Love×2♪song (instrumental)
 Kono Hana Saku Koro
Released by LOVE×TRAX☆Records on August 29, 2005
  - Piano no Mori no Mankai no Shita opening theme
  - Piano no Mori no Mankai no Shita ending theme
 Kono Hana saku koro (instrumental)
 Chiru Hana Sakura (instrumental)
 Eternal Destiny
Released by LOVE×TRAX☆Records on September 30, 2005
 Eternal Destiny - Yoake Mae yori Ruri Iro na opening theme
 Love☆Emergency - LOVE×Radio main theme
 Eternal Destiny (instrumental)
 Love☆Emergency (instrumental)
 Imitation
Released by LOVE×TRAX☆Records on April 14, 2006
 Imitation - Imitation Lover opening theme
 feel - Imitation Lover ending theme
 Imitation (instrumental)
 feel (instrumental)
 Dream a go!go!
Released by DreamParty Secretariat on October 13, 2006
 Dream a go!go! - DreamParty 2nd image song
  - DreamParty image song
  (short version) - Alpeggio opening theme
 Dream a go! go!（OffVocal）
 Motto, Yume, Miyō!! (off Vocal)
 Magical★Generation
Released by Media Factory on October 25, 2006
  - Happiness! ending theme
  - Happiness! De:Luxe opening theme
 Magical★Generation (off Vocal)
 Happiness Hōteishiki (off Vocal)
 Again
Released by Star Child on October 25, 2006
 Again - Otome wa Boku ni Koishiteru insert song
 Beautiful day - Otome wa Boku ni Koishiteru ending theme
 Again (off Vocal)
 Beautiful day (off Vocal)
 Far Away
Released by LOVE×TRAX☆Records on April 6, 2007
 Far Away - Figurehead opening theme
  - Figurehead main theme
 Far Away (instrumental)
 Ai no Uta (instrumental)
 Premonition Dream / Shiny Road
Released by DreamParty Secretariat on April 29, 2007 (in DreamParty 2007 Spring) / May 4, 2007 (general)
 Premonition Dream - DreamParty 2007 Spring image song
 Shiny Road - DreamParty 2007 Spring image song
 Premonition Dream (off vocal)
 Shiny Road (off vocal)
 Soshite Boku wa...
Released by Five Records on October 24, 2007
  - Prism Ark (anime) opening theme
 RISE -  Prism Ark AWAKE (PS2) ending theme
 Soshite Boku wa... (off vocal)
 RISE (off vocal)
 SHINING STAR
Released by LOVE×TRAX☆Records on October 25, 2007
 SHINING STAR - Itsuka, Todoku, Anosora ni. opening theme
 SHINING STAR (instrumental)
 Katayoku no Icarus
Released by b-fairy records on January 25, 2008
  - H2O: Footprints in the Sand opening theme
  - H2O: Footprints in the Sand insert song
 Katayoku no Icarus (off vocal)
 Switch on♪ (off vocal)
 Koisuru Kioku / Negai
Released by Geneon Entertainment on February 29, 2008; This maxi single contains a song by Chata.
  (Yui Sakakibara) - Yotsunoha (OVA) opening theme
  (Chata) - Yotsunoha (OVA) ending theme
 Koisuru Kioku (off vocal)
 Negai (off vocal)
 Koi no Honoo
Released by 5pb. on April 23, 2008
  - Kanokon (anime) ending theme
 Sweet Time - Kanokon Radio ending theme
  (off vocal)
 Sweet Time (off vocal)
 Soon / Love Rice
Released by Geneon Entertainment on July 23, 2008; This maxi single contains a song by Chata.
 Soon (Yui Sakakibara) - Yotsunoha: A journey of sincerity opening theme
  (Chata) - Yotsunoha: A journey of sincerity ending theme
 Soon (off vocal)
 Love Rice (off vocal)
 Soon (GAMEver.) (Yui Sakakibara) - Yotsunoha: A journey of sincerity opening theme
 Love Rice (Chata) - Yotsunoha: A journey of sincerity ending theme
 Eien no Koi
Released by 5pb. on September 24, 2008
  - Kanokon Esuii ending theme
  - Kanokon Esuii insert song
 Eien no Koi (off vocal)
 Natsu no Inori (off vocal)
 Try Real!
Released by Geneon Entertainment on October 29, 2008
 Try Real! - Fate/tiger colosseum UPPER theme song
 Try Real! (off vocal ver.)
 Try Real! (fate on fake mix / Sampling Master MEGA)
 Gessei no Kanon
Released by b-fairy records on November 26, 2008
  - Galaxy Angel II Eigō Kaiki no Toki opening theme
  - Galaxy Angel II Eigō Kaiki no Toki insert song
 Gessei no Kanon (off vocal)
 Unmei no Revolution (off vocal)
 Love Island
Released by LOVE×TRAX☆Records on December 24, 2008; This maxi single was sold on only Comic Toranoana.
 Love Island - 15 Bishōjo Hyōrūki opening theme
 chance - 15 Bishōjo Hyōrūki ending theme
 Love Island（instrumental）
 chance （instrumental）
 Tsurugi no Mai
Released by b-fairy records on February 4, 2009
  - Musō Tōrō theme song
  - Musō Tōrō insert song
 Tsurugi no Mai (off vocal)
 Toki o Koete (off vocal)
 KoIGoRoMo / Eternal Snow
Released by Five Records on March 25, 2009
 KoIGoRoMo - Kemeko Deluxe! DS: Yome to Mecha to Otoko to Onna opening theme
 Eternal Snow - Anison Plus opening theme in February 2009
 KoIGoRoMo (off vocal)
 Eternal Snow (off vocal)
 Marionette
Released by LOVE×TRAX☆Records on March 25, 2009
 Marionette - PYGMALION opening theme
 
 Marionette (instrumental)
 Haitoku no Waltz (instrumental)
 Déjà vu / Silky Rain
Released by 5pb. on March 25, 2009
 Déjà vu - Hapitora -Happy Transportation- opening theme
 Silky Rain - Anison Plus opening theme in June 2009
 Déjà vu (off vocal)
 Silky Rain (off vocal)
 Nyanderful!/Cross the Rainbow
Released by Five Records on October 21, 2009
  - Nyan Koi! opening theme
 Cross the Rainbow - Nyan Koi! Radio Jōkō Rikujōbu ending theme
 Nyanderful! (off vocal)
 Cross the Rainbow (off vocal)
Komorebi no Sordino
Released by 5pb. on November 25, 2009
  - Kanokon: Manatsu no Dai Shanikusai opening theme
  - Akatsuki no Amaneca to Aoi Kyojin opening theme
 Komorebi no Sordino (off vocal)
 Hollow: Akatsuki no Sora ni (off vocal)
 Happy⇔Lucky X'mas♪
Released by LOVE×TRAX☆Records on December 18, 2009
 Happy⇔Lucky X'mas♪
 I remembers
 Happy⇔Lucky X'mas♪ (instrumental)
 I remembers (instrumental)
 Konton no Oratorio
Released by b-fairy records on February 10, 2010
  - Game Book DS: Aquarian Age Perpetual Period theme song
 
 Konton no Oratorio (off vocal)
 Blue Bird Syndrome (off vocal)
 Let's start now
Released by LOVE×TRAX☆Records on July 30, 2010
 Let's start now - Sora o Aogite Kumo Takaku theme song
 I don't wanna forget - Sora o Aogite Kumo Takaku ending theme
 Let's start now (instrumental)
 I don't wanna forget (instrumental)
 LOVE×Quartet 2010
Released by LOVE×TRAX☆Records on December 24, 2010
 Again (Quartet Ver.)
  (Quartet Ver.)
  (Quartet Ver.)
 Again (violin Ver.)
 Kono Hana Saku Koro (violin Ver.)
 Katayoku no Icarus (violin Ver.)
 Again (Quartet Instrumental)
 Kono Hana Saku Koro (Quartet Instrumental)
 Katayoku no Icarus (Quartet Instrumental)

References

External links 
  
 

Living people
Anime musicians
Japanese choreographers
Japanese video game actresses
Japanese voice actresses
Musicians from Hyōgo Prefecture
Voice actresses from Hyōgo Prefecture
20th-century Japanese actresses
21st-century Japanese actresses
21st-century Japanese singers
Year of birth missing (living people)
21st-century Japanese women singers